Father Antonio Demo  (April 23, 1870 – January 2, 1936) was a New York City Italian American priest and civic activist.

He studied at seminaries in Italy and entered the Scalabrini Order in 1894. Prior to his ordination, Demo served in the Italian military. He was ordained a priest on July 20, 1896, the same year he emigrated to the United States. He initially did missionary work for two years in the parish of the Sacred Heart in Boston, which served a congregation of Italian immigrants mostly from Genoa. On July 19, 1899, he was assigned as assistant pastor of Our Lady of Pompeii Church, established in 1892 by Father Pietro Bandini in New York City's Greenwich Village on Bleecker and Carmine Streets. In 1900 he was appointed pastor of the church, which served what was then one of largest Italian-American communities in America.

Father Demo exercised his apostolate among the Italian immigrants, serving until 1923 also as the director of the St. Raphael Society for the Protection of Italian Immigrants, an organization that had been specifically formed in 1891 by Bandini to assist newly arrived immigrants and that he helped to strengthen. His spiritual care and leadership were put to test on March 25, 1911, when he had to respond to the tragic Triangle Shirtwaist Company fire, which claimed the lives of 146 female employees. Because of his many merits in the care of the Italian community  he was decorated with the "Cross of Knight of the Crown of Italy".

In 1923 Father Demo learned that the church would have to be demolished to allow extension of the Sixth Avenue. Father Demo organized a campaign to buy a nearby property and with the help of a leading Italian American architect, Matthew Del Gaudio, build a new church and rectory. The new church was available for the congregation in May 1927. In late Summer 1931 the parochial school also was opened.

In 1935 Father Demo became Pompei's pastor emeritus and superintendent of its parochial school. He died in 1936 in Greenwich Village in New York City, and thousands of parishioners and friends, including Mayor Fiorello La Guardia, paid their respects.

In 1941, the intersection of Bleecker Street and Sixth Avenue was named Father Demo Square. In 2009, after a renovation, Father Demo Square was honored with a Village Award by the Greenwich Village Society for Historic Preservation.

References
Notes

Bibliography
Brown, Mary Elizabeth. "Italian Immigrant Catholic Clergy and an Exception to the Rule: The Revered Antonio Demo, Our Lady of Pompeii, Greenwich Village, 1899-1933."  In Church History 62.1 (March 1993): 41–59.
Falco, Nicholas Joseph. "Antonio Demo." In The Italian American Experience: An Encyclopedia, ed. Salvatore J. LaGumina (New York: Garland, 2000), 177–78.

External links 
 Biography of Father Demo
 Scalabrinians Official Website
 Our Lady of Pompeii Church

1870 births
1936 deaths
Italian emigrants to the United States
Religious leaders from New York City
Scalabrinians
History of Catholicism in the United States
19th-century American Roman Catholic priests
20th-century American Roman Catholic priests